The West Dolores River is a  tributary of the Dolores River, in southwestern Colorado in the United States. Its source is northeast of Mount Wilson in the Lizard Head Wilderness of Dolores County, Colorado.  The river flows southwest to a confluence with the Dolores in Montezuma County.

See also
List of rivers of Colorado
List of tributaries of the Colorado River

References

Rivers of Colorado
Rivers of Dolores County, Colorado
Rivers of Montezuma County, Colorado
Tributaries of the Colorado River in Colorado